Prapreče pri Straži is a small settlement in the Municipality of Straža in southeastern Slovenia. It lies just south of Potok. The area is part of the traditional region of Lower Carniola and is now included in the Southeast Slovenia Statistical Region.

Name
The name of the settlement was changed from Prapreče to Prapreče pri Gorenji Straži in 1953. The name was changed again to Prapreče pri Straži in 1988.

References

External links
Prapreče pri Straži at Geopedia

Populated places in the Municipality of Straža